Rally UHC Cycling can refer to:

 Rally UHC Cycling (men's team)
 Rally UHC Cycling (women's team)